Mark Wayne Curtis (born 22 February 1967) is a Welsh former professional footballer who played in the Football League for Cardiff City.

Born in Neath, Curtis began his career with Swansea City but was released by the club without making a first-team appearance. He later attended a trial with their South Wales rivals Cardiff City and joined the club on non-contract terms. He made his debut for the Bluebirds on 21 September 1985 in a 3–0 defeat to Blackpool and his performances saw manager Alan Durban offer Curtis a full-time contract with the club. However, after making over 30 appearances in his first season, he dropped out of favour at the club under new manager Frank Burrows and made just one appearance in the following two seasons before being released at the end of the 1986–87.

References

1967 births
Living people
Footballers from Neath
Welsh footballers
Association football defenders
Swansea City A.F.C. players
Cardiff City F.C. players
English Football League players